Malcolm Williams (born 16 August 1949) is a former Guyanese cricketer who played a single first-class match for Essequibo in the final of the 1980–81 inter-county Jones Cup.

Williams was born in Vergenoegen in what was then British Guiana (now part of Guyana's Essequibo Islands-West Demerara  region). He was one of two players from Vergenoegen in the Essequibo side, the other being Kamroze Mohammed. The match was played against Berbice at the Kayman Sankar Cricket Ground in Hampton Court (on the Atlantic coast). Williams, a bowler and tail-end batsman, failed to take a wicket during the game, bowling five overs in Berbice's first innings and two in their second. He scored three runs while batting in Essequibo's first innings, and made 15 runs in the second innings before being dismissed by spinner Jerry Angus, who had him stumped by Milton Pydanna, a future West Indies ODI player.

Berbice won the match by nine wickets in what was Essequibo's only first-class match – only the final of the three-team Jones Cup (later the Guystac Trophy) was accorded first-class status, and Essequibo made the final only once, having defeated Demerara in an earlier match. The scorecards of the non-first-class matches played by Essequibo are not available before the late 1990s, and it is therefore uncertain how Williams played for Essequibo (if at all) in earlier matches.

References

1949 births
Living people
Essequibo cricketers
Guyanese cricketers
People from Essequibo Islands-West Demerara